Li Wenhai may refer to:

Li Wenhai (historian) (born 1932), Chinese historian
Li Wenhai (actor), Singaporean actor